The Pink Singers were formed on 7 April 1983, making the Pinkies the longest-running LGBT choir in Europe.

Introduction
Originally formed as a small all male ensemble after an open newspaper invite, the Pink Singers has grown over the past three decades into an SATB choir of approximately 90 members, making it the UK's largest Lesbian, Gay, Bisexual and Transgender (LGBT) chorus. Every year is made up of two musical seasons starting in February and September. Each culminates in a large London concert and the choir have performed in venues such as Cadogan Hall, Hackney Empire, The Troxy. The choir also undertakes multiple public and private performances at large events, campaigns, corporate events, weddings and civil partnerships.

Each season starts with anyone with an interest in joining being invited to try out a few rehearsals so they can feel the social as well as musical make up of the choir, which is then followed by an audition. The Pink Singers are a fully mixed choir of varying abilities, ages, genders, and offer all members an opportunity to either learn new, or further develop existing musical abilities over a wide variety of genres and styles.

The choice of music sung by the choir is as eclectic as the membership makeup itself, everything from pop to classical to jazz, folk and show tunes. Variety in a single show can range from Elgar to Ellie Goulding, or from Mozart to Massive Attack. There are multiple choreographed numbers each season also, adding a visual spectacle to the musical.

Structure
The choir's singing members are split across 8 voices, upper and lower registers each for Soprano, Alto, Tenor and Bass sections respectively. This vocal range gives the choir great flexibility in musical pieces tackled over the years, from simple 2 part harmonies through to full 12 part splits when including semi-chorus parts.

Musical seasons in the past few years have all had a theme for the final concert. Choir members offer up fresh themes each season, which are decided on by a musical team made up of both paid and volunteer members, led by the Musical and Artistic Directors who also run each rehearsal.

The Pink Singers is a registered UK charity (1151365) and is run entirely through a volunteer committee. The choir also employs the professional support of a Musical Director and a trained accompanist.

Historic overview
The choir was founded by Brian Kennedy and Mark Bunyan in 1983. Kennedy, author of Kennedy's Gay Guide to London was inspired by the large gay choruses which had taken off in the USA. He persuaded Bunyan, a cabaret artiste making a name for himself, to take the reins of the musical direction for the first few months. The first public performance was at London Pride in 1983. The LGBT landscape in the UK then was substantially different to today: the age of consent was unequal, AIDS had barely reached the political agenda, Britain had not yet had appointed an openly gay MP, and any form of legally-recognised partnership between same-sex couples seemed like a pipe dream. The choir was established to be a counterpart to the choruses which had emerged in the US and one of its first actions was to provide music at that year's Lesbian & Gay Pride march, in support of the political changes happening at the time.

As more freedoms and rights have been granted to LGBT individuals and partners the principal aims of the choir have also evolved, which were codified when the choir became a UK charity:
 To promote, improve, develop and maintain appreciation of and education of the public, in particular but not exclusively the LGBT community, in the art and science of music in all its aspects by any means the management committee sees fit, including through the presentation of public concerts and recitals to the highest possible standard.
 To promote equality and diversity for the public benefit with particular reference to the LGBT community and in particular but not exclusively by:
 advancing education and raising awareness in equality and diversity;
 promoting activities to foster understanding between people from diverse backgrounds;
 cultivating a sentiment in favour of equality and diversity in particular through celebrating the diversity of the LGBT community.

Under these aims the Pink Singers have performed all over the constituent countries of the UK, as well as in the past in Ireland, Iceland, Portugal, Finland, Mallorca, Greece, Malta, the Netherlands the United States & India. As the longest running LGBT choir in Europe the Pink Singers have also built up long lasting relationships with other LGBT choirs and choruses worldwide, and has been instrumental in helping smaller UK based choirs grow and develop. The Pink Singers have in the past been joint hosts of the Various Voices choral festival and as part of the choir's 30th anniversary celebrations held a full day festival and concert for 17 of the UK's LGBT music groups, 'Hand in Hand'.

Online presence
In addition to its website, The Pink Singers has a wide online presence.

The Pink Singers is a member of the UK network of choirs, Proud Voices. As part of their ongoing work to help spread and grow the tradition of LGBT choral music the Pink Singers were instrumental in setting up a sister organisation, Proud Voices Asia, who hosted Asia's first ever LGBT choral festival in 2015.

Discography

By Special Arrangement (2016)
All tracks on By Special Arrangement were arranged by past or present choir members. Part of the CD sale profits are benefitting two different LGBT charities; Diversity Role Models, and the Albert Kennedy Trust.

P.S. We're 30 (2012)

Recorded in November 2012 as part of the choir's anniversary celebrations, P.S. We’re 30 showcases a fabulous array of the choir's most memorable repertoire, brought together from over its thirty-year history.

Live (2008)

Live is the second album recorded by the Pink Singers. All the tracks were recorded live over several choir seasons from different concerts held in various London performance venues between 2001 and 2008.

Hand in Hand (2000)

Hand in Hand was the first album recorded by the Pink Singers, and was compiled in 2000 from recordings made at various concerts, including a successful evening at the Royal Academy of Music.

Hand in Hand choral festival
The Pink Singers founded the Hand in Hand choral festival as part of their 30th birthday celebrations in July 2013. The first Hand in Hand was held at The Troxy in east London. It brought members of 23 LGBT choirs from Britain and Ireland together to take part in musical workshops. Twelve choirs performed in the evening concert. The Pink Singers debuted 'The Great Choir of London', a two-part composition that was written for them by Richard Thomas. The Pink Singers opened the festival by performing the first part, 'I, Choir', alone. The second part, 'Earth, Wind and Choir' was sung by all of the choirs taking part in the festival.

The second Hand in Hand festival was hosted in Brighton 12–14 June 2015, jointly hosted by Brighton Gay Men's Chorus and the Rainbow Chorus. In 2017, Hand in Hand was hosted by the Manchester Lesbian and Gay Chorus. The 4th Hand in Hand festival was held in Cardiff in August 2019, hosted by the South Wales Gay Men's Chorus and the Songbirds.

The festival title references the song, 'Hand in Hand', composed by Dawn Rogers and Tricia Walker. Hand in Hand is almost certainly the Pink Singers’ most frequently performed song. On their second trip to the US in 1992, they were invited to take part in the GALA Choruses Festival in Denver. At the Festival, the Tampa Bay Gay Men's Chorus closed their set with 'Hand In Hand' – that was the first time the choir had heard it – and they sang it jointly with them the next time they returned to the US, to Florida in 1996. They used it as the title of their first CD and performed it at the Memorial Service for the victims of the Admiral Duncan bombing in 1999. When Pride London was set up in 2004, they opened and closed the Trafalgar Square rally with it.

References

London choirs
Musical groups established in 1983
LGBT culture in London